Zaidín or Saidí is a municipality located in the province of Huesca, Aragon, Spain. According to the 2004 census (INE), the municipality has a population of 1,721 inhabitants.

See also
 Bajo Cinca/Baix Cinca
 Francesc Serés

References

Municipalities in the Province of Huesca